The 2020–21 season was the 77th season in the existence of Lille OSC and the club's 21st consecutive season in the top flight of French football. In addition to the domestic league, Lille participated in this season's edition of the Coupe de France and the UEFA Europa League. The season covered the period from 1 July 2020 to 30 June 2021.

On 23 May 2021, with a win over Angers on the final day of the season, Lille were crowned league champions. The achievement was very surprising and was considered an upset, as Paris Saint-Germain had always been the favourites to win Ligue 1 for the fourth time in a row. It was Lille's fourth top-flight title in the professional era and their first since 2010–11, when Eden Hazard was named the competition's player of the year. Lille's points tally of 83 was the best in their history and they only lost three matches all season.

Players

First-team squad

Out on loan

Transfers

In

Out

Loans out

Pre-season and friendlies

Competitions

Overall record

Ligue 1

League table

Results summary

Results by round

Matches
The league fixtures were announced on 9 July 2020.

Coupe de France

UEFA Europa League

Group stage

The group stage draw was held on 2 October 2020.

Knockout phase

Round of 32
The draw for the round of 32 was held on 14 December 2020.

Statistics

Appearances and goals

|-
! colspan=14 style=background:#dcdcdc; text-align:center| Goalkeepers

|-
! colspan=14 style=background:#dcdcdc; text-align:center| Defenders

|-
! colspan=14 style=background:#dcdcdc; text-align:center| Midfielders

|-
! colspan=14 style=background:#dcdcdc; text-align:center| Forwards

|-
! colspan=14 style=background:#dcdcdc; text-align:center| Players transferred out during the season

Goalscorers
{| class="wikitable" style="text-align:center"
|-
!width=15|
!width=15|
!width=15|
!width=145|Player
!width=120|Ligue 1
!width=120|Coupe de France
!width=120|Europa League
!width=120|Total
|-
|1
|17
|FW
|align=left| Burak Yılmaz
|16
|0
|2
|18
|-
|2
|12
|MF
|align=left| Yusuf Yazıcı
|7
|0
|7
|14
|-
|3
|9
|FW
|align=left| Jonathan David
|13
|0
|0
|13
|-
|rowspan=2|4
|7
|FW
|align=left| Jonathan Bamba
|6
|0
|1
|7
|-
|10
|MF
|align=left| Jonathan Ikoné
|4
|0
|3
|7
|-
|6
|22
|FW
|align=left| Timothy Weah
|3
|0
|2
|5
|-
|rowspan=2|7
|2
|DF
|align=left| Zeki Çelik
|3
|0
|1
|4
|-
|11
|FW
|align=left| Luiz Araújo
|4
|0
|0
|4
|-
|9
|6
|DF
|align=left| José Fonte
|3
|0
|0
|3
|-
|10
|8
|MF
|align=left| Xeka
|1
|1
|0
|2
|-
|rowspan=3|11
|18
|MF
|align=left| Renato Sanches
|1
|0
|0
|1
|-
|29
|DF
|align=left| Domagoj Bradarić
|1
|0
|0
|1
|-
|–
|MF
|align=left| Aguibou Camara
|0
|1
|0
|1
|-
|colspan=4|Own goals
|2
|2
|0
|4
|-
!colspan=4|Totals
!64
!4
!16
!84

Notes

References

External links

Lille OSC seasons
Lille
Lille
French football championship-winning seasons